Eccellenza Apulia is the regional Eccellenza football division for clubs in the Southern Italian region of Apulia, Italy. It is competed among 18 teams, in one group. The winners of the Groups are promoted to Serie D. The club who finishes second also have the chance to gain promotion, they are entered into a national play-off which consists of two rounds.

Champions
Here are the past champions of the Apulia Eccellenza, organised into their respective seasons.

1991–92 Noci  	 	 	
1992–93 Toma Maglie 			
1993–94 San Severo 			
1994–95 Massafra 			
1995–96 Martina		
1996–97 Noicattaro			
1997–98 Aradeo		
1998–99 Virtus Locorotondo 							  		
1999–00 Ostuni
2000–01 Grottaglie		
2001–02 Fortis Trani			
2002–03 Bitonto		
2003–04 Gallipoli		
2004–05 Monopoli		
2005–06 Barletta	
2006–07 Fasano
2007–08 Francavilla
2008–09 Casarano
2009–10 Nardò
2010–11 Martina
2011–12 Monopoli
2012–13 San Severo
2013–14 Gallipoli
2014–15 Virtus Francavilla
2015–16 Gravina
2016–17 Audace Cerignola
2017–18 Fasano
2018–19 Casarano
2019–20 Molfetta Calcio
2020–21 Virtus Matino
2021–22 Barletta

References

External links
Some Club Histories In the League

Sport in Apulia
Apulia
Sports leagues established in 1991
1991 establishments in Italy
Football clubs in Italy
Association football clubs established in 1991